BGHS may refer to:

Australia
Bankstown Girls High School, Bankstown, New South Wales
Birrong Girls High School, Birrong, New South Wales 
Burwood Girls High School, Croydon, New South Wales

India
Baldwin Girls High School, Bangalore
Ballygunge Government High School, Kolkata

United States
Barbara Goleman High School, Miami Lakes, Florida
Barry Goldwater High School, Phoenix, Arizona
Beech Grove High School, Beech Grove, Indiana
Bell Gardens High School, Bell Gardens, California
Bishop Garrigan High School, Algona, Iowa
Bishop Gorman High School, Summerlin, Nevada
Bishop Guertin High School, Nashua, New Hampshire
Bishop Guilfoyle High School, Altoona, Pennsylvania
Bolsa Grande High School, Garden Grove, California
Boone Grove High School, Valparaiso, Indiana
Bowling Green High School (Kentucky), Bowling Green, Kentucky
Bowling Green High School (Ohio), Bowling Green, Ohio
Buffalo Gap High School, Swoope, Virginia
Buffalo Grove High School, Buffalo Grove, Illinois